Rhinoceros Eyes is a 2003 American-Canadian drama film written and directed by Aaron Woodley. It was awarded the Discovery Award at the 2003 Toronto International Film Festival.

Cast
Michael Pitt as Chep
Paige Turco as Fran
Gale Harold as Phil Barbara
Matt Servitto as Bundy
James Allodi as Hamish
Victor Ertmanis as Sweets
Nadia Litz as Ann

References

External links

Films directed by Aaron Woodley
2003 films
American crime drama films
Films scored by John Cale
2003 crime drama films
English-language Canadian films
Canadian crime drama films
Films about autism
2000s English-language films
2000s American films
2000s Canadian films